PS Contant is a  owned and operated by the Seychelles Coast Guard. She was formerly operated by the Indian Navy as INS Tarasa (T63). India, as well as the United Arab Emirates, have helped equip the Seychelles Coast Guard with patrol vessels. India and the UAE helped equip the tiny Seychelles with these patrol vessels due to its strategic location, very near the area off the Horn of Africa that is notorious for pirate attacks.

India's most senior naval officer, Robin Dhowan, traveled to Seychelles, for the official handover.  She was the second vessel India turned over to Seychelles. Tarmugli was re-christened  when she was transferred in 2005.

See also

References

External links

 

Trinkat-class patrol vessels
Seychelles Coast Guard